Marcello Barbieri (born 13 February 1971) is an Italian gymnast. He competed at the 1996 Summer Olympics.

References

External links
 

1971 births
Living people
Italian male artistic gymnasts
Olympic gymnasts of Italy
Gymnasts at the 1996 Summer Olympics
Sportspeople from Modena